Ford Two is an EP by American hip hop group Atmosphere. It was released on Rhymesayers Entertainment in 2000. It is the second installment of the  Ford EP series, the first being Ford One.

Track listing

References

External links
 

2000 EPs
Atmosphere (music group) albums
Rhymesayers Entertainment EPs